Kilpatrick is a townland in County Westmeath, Ireland.

Kilpatrick is one of 3 townlands of the civil parish of Kilpatrick in the barony of Fore in the Province of Leinster. The neighbouring townlands are: Barbavilla Demesne to the north, Rickardstown to the east, Clondalever to the south, Derrynagaragh to the west and Ballybeg to the north–west.

In the 1911 census of Ireland there were 21 houses and 96 inhabitants in the townland.

References

External links
Map of Kilpatrick at openstreetmap.org
Kilpatrick at The IreAtlas Townland Data Base
Kilpatrick at Townlands.ie
Kilpatrick at the Placenames Database of Ireland

Townlands of County Westmeath